The Robec (Old Norse raudh, red and bekkr, stream) is a small river in Seine-Maritime, Normandy, France. Its length is 8.9 km. The river begins near Fontaine-sous-Préaux, then it flows through Darnétal and ends in the Aubette in Rouen.

In order to avoid a repetition of the floods that have affected the valleys of the Cailly, the Robec and the Aubette, a schéma d'aménagement et de gestion des eaux (water resource management scheme) is under consideration.

References

Rivers of Seine-Maritime
Rivers of France
Rivers of Normandy